Bhainsahi is a river located in Uttar Pradesh of India. Bhansahi river flows about 175 km, passing through the districts of Ghazipur, Mau and Azamgarh. It rises near Dostpur in Sultanpur and its mouth opens to Tons river near the town of Bahaduraganj.

References

Rivers of Uttar Pradesh